Sirsha is a census town in the Faridpur Durgapur CD block in the Durgapur subdivision of the Paschim Bardhaman district in the Indian state of West Bengal.

Geography

Location

Banagram, Mandarbani, Sirsha, Nabaghanapur, Sarpi and Ichhapur form a series of census towns along the western border of Faridpur-Durgapur CD Block.

Urbanisation
According to the 2011 census, 79.22% of the population of the Durgapur subdivision was urban and 20.78% was rural. The Durgapur subdivision has 1 municipal corporation at Durgapur and 38 (+1 partly) census towns  (partly presented in the map alongside; all places marked on the map are linked in the full-screen map).

Demographics
According to the 2011 Census of India, Sirsha had a total population of 4,600, of which 2,436 (53%) were males and 2,164 (47%) were females. Population in the age range 0–6 years was 390. The total number of literate persons in Sirsha was 3,394 (80.62% of the population over 6 years).

*For language details see Faridpur Durgapur#Language and religion

 India census, Sirsha had a population of 5,215. Males constitute 56% of the population and females 44%. Sirsha has an average literacy rate of 66%, higher than the national average of 59.5%: male literacy is 75%, and female literacy is 55%. In Sirsha, 12% of the population is under 6 years of age.

Infrastructure

According to the District Census Handbook 2011, Bardhaman, Sirsha covered an area of 5.41 km2. Among the civic amenities, the protected water-supply involved overhead tank, tap water from treated sources, uncovered well. It had 422 domestic electric connections. Among the medical facilities it had 1 medicine shop. Among the educational facilities it had were 3 primary schools, other school facilities at Kalipur 3 km away or Laudoha 2 km away. Among the important commodities it produced were paddy, wheat and mustard.

Education
Sirsha has one primary school.

References

Cities and towns in Paschim Bardhaman district